Liu Hsiu-mei (born 28 November 1972) is a Taiwanese football referee and former player. She was the winner of AFC Assistant Referee of the Year in 2007.

Liu was part of Chinese Taipei squad in the 1991 FIFA Women's World Cup. After retiring from player career, she qualified as international football assistant referee in 2001 and has participated in several international tournaments, such as FIFA Women's World Cup (2003 and 2007), AFC Women's Asian Cup (2006 and 2010), Asian Games (2002 and 2006) and the Summer Olympics (2008).

References

1972 births
Living people
Taiwanese women's footballers
Taiwanese football referees
Women association football referees
1991 FIFA Women's World Cup players
Chinese Taipei women's international footballers
FIFA Women's World Cup referees
Olympic football referees
Women's association football midfielders